Surrounded may refer to:

Books
The Surrounded, a 1936 novel by D'Arcy McNickle
Surrounded, a 1974 novel by Dean Koontz writing as Brian Coffey

Films
Surrounded (1960 film), a Norwegian film directed by Arne Skouen
Surrounded (upcoming film), an American film directed by Anthony Mandler

Music
Surrounded (band), an alternative rock/space rock band from Sweden

Albums
Surrounded, an album by Checkfield 2003
Surrounded (Björk album), 2006
Surrounded, an album by Men of Standard, 2006, or the title song
Surrounded (Richard Buckner album), 2013, or the title song
Surrounded (Michael W. Smith album), 2018
Surrounded, an album by Justin Sullivan (singer of New Model Army), 2021

Songs
"Surrounded" (Chantal Kreviazuk song), 1996
"Surrounded", a song by The Chills, 1996
"Surrounded", a song by Syl Johnson
"Surrounded", a song by Dream Theater from the 1992 album Images and Words
"Surrounded", a song by Reks from the 2016 album The Greatest X
"Surrounded", a song by Wage War from the 2016 album Blueprints (Anniversary Edition bonus track)